Abraham Jacobus Griesel (born 15 January 1992 in Bloemfontein, South Africa) is a South African rugby union player who last played for the  in the Currie Cup and in the Rugby Challenge. His regular position is scrum-half.

Career

Youth

At school level, he was included in the Free State Under-13 team that played at the 2005 Under-13 Craven Week competition and in their Under-18 side that played at the Academy Week tournament in 2010.

He made seven starts and two appearances off the bench for the  during the 2011 Under-19 Provincial Championship and two appearances for the  side in 2012.

2012 IRB Junior World Championship

In 2012, Griesel was a member of the South Africa national under-20 rugby union team that participated at the 2012 IRB Junior World Championship held in South Africa. He started their first match of the competition, a 23–19 defeat to Ireland. He came on as a late substitute in their next match against Italy and didn't make an appearance in their final pool match against England, where South Africa got a 28–15 victory to ensure their qualification for the semi-finals. He played off the bench in their semi-final clash with Argentina, but remained an unused substitute for the final, where the hosts triumphed 22–16 over New Zealand to win the competition for the first time.

Free State Cheetahs

His introduction to first class provincial rugby came during the 2014 Vodacom Cup competition, where the played for the  after moving back to Bloemfontein. He made a further three substitute appearances in the Cheetahs' next three matches.

Griquas

He moved to Kimberley shortly after to link up with a  side trying to qualify for the 2014 Currie Cup Premier Division. Although he was named in their squad for the 2014 Currie Cup qualification series, he failed to make an appearance, but was retained for their Premier League campaign.

Munster

Having moved to All-Ireland League side Young Munster in 2016, Griesel made his debut for Munster on 4 November 2016, coming on as a replacement for Duncan Williams in the 2016–17 Pro12 fixture against Ospreys.

Pumas

Griesel returned to South Africa for the 2018 season, joining the Nelspruit-based  prior to the 2018 Rugby Challenge.

References

South African rugby union players
Living people
1992 births
Rugby union players from Bloemfontein
Rugby union scrum-halves
Free State Cheetahs players
Griquas (rugby union) players
South Africa Under-20 international rugby union players
Munster Rugby players
Young Munster players